This is a list of the Los Premios MTV Latinoamérica winners and nominees for Video of the Year.

See also
 Latin Grammy Award for Best Short Form Music Video
 Lo Nuestro Award for Video of the Year

Latin American music awards
Latin American music
MTV Video Music Awards